Thrixspermum saruwatarii is a species of orchid native central and southern Taiwan.

References

External links

saruwatarii
Orchids of Taiwan